Negel (also known as Nigal, Nīgel, and Nowgel) is a village in Negel Rural District, Kalatrazan District, Sanandaj County, Kurdistan Province, Iran. At the 2006 census, its population was 1,697, in 414 families. The village is populated by Kurds.

An old manuscript copy of the Quran is kept in a safe in the village’s mosque. The copy is a parchment with the verses of the Quran written in Kufic script.

References 

Towns and villages in Sanandaj County
Kurdish settlements in Kurdistan Province